Dornach-Arlesheim railway station is a railway station in the municipality of Arlesheim, in the Swiss canton of Basel-Landschaft. It is an intermediate stop on the Basel–Biel/Bienne line and is served by local trains only. The station is located just north of the border with the is on the border with the Canton of Solothurn and the municipality of Dornach.

The  Basel–Dornach railway line terminates in the station forecourt. Connection is available to Line 10 of the Basel tram network, which uses the line between Dornach and Basel.

Services 
Dornach-Arlesheim is served by the S3 of the Basel S-Bahn:

 : half-hourly service from Porrentruy or Laufen to Olten.

References

External links 
 
 

Railway stations in Basel-Landschaft
Swiss Federal Railways stations